Richard Houston Gaines (July 23, 1904 – July 20, 1975) was an American actor. He appeared in over 75 film and television productions between 1940 and 1962.

Early years 
Gaines was born in Indian Territory and grew up in Texas, learning "to handle the ax, the plough, and the lariat". He enrolled at Texas Christian University when he was 16 and studied drama there. While a student there he acted in productions of little theaters in Dallas and Fort Worth.

He worked at a variety of jobs in the United States and in France before winning a scholarship to study at the American Laboratory Theatre.

Career 
Gaines appeared in five Broadway productions between 1929 and 1942. He served as Raymond Massey's replacement as Abraham Lincoln in the original production of Robert E. Sherwood's Abe Lincoln in Illinois (1938–1939).

In Hollywood, Gaines frequently played professional or officious types in supporting roles. He was often seen in authoritarian roles as a lawyer, doctor, supervisor or father. Gaines made his film debut as Patrick Henry in the historical drama The Howards of Virginia with Cary Grant. One of his best-known roles was as Jean Arthur's stuffy suitor Charles J. Pendergast in The More the Merrier (1943), directed by George Stevens. He also appeared in  a small role in Billy Wilder's film classic Double Indemnity (1944), playing the insurance boss of Fred MacMurray and Edward G. Robinson. In Cecil B. DeMille's Unconquered (1947), Gaines portrayed the historical role of George Washington. He worked frequently on television during the 1950s. Between 1958 and 1961, he had a recurring role as a judge in 14 episodes of Perry Mason.

Personal life 
 
On September 30, 1936, Gaines married actress Brenda Marshall; the couple divorced in 1940. They had one daughter, Virginia, who later grew up with Marshall and her second husband William Holden after Holden subsequently adopted Virginia Gaines when the couple married in 1941. Gaines retired from Hollywood business in 1962 after a guest appearance on Alfred Hitchcock Presents, and he died in North Hollywood, Los Angeles, on July 20, 1975, three days before his 71st birthday.

Selected filmography 

 The Howards of Virginia (1940) – Patrick Henry
 A Night to Remember (1942) – Lingle
 The More the Merrier (1943) – Charles J. Pendergast
 Tender Comrade (1943) – Waldo Pierson (uncredited)
 Double Indemnity (1944) – Edward S. Norton Jr.
 Mr. Winkle Goes to War (1944) – Ralph Westcott
 Double Exposure (1944) – James R. Turlock
 The Enchanted Cottage (1945) – Frederick 'Freddy' Price
 Twice Blessed (1945) – Senator John Pringle
 Don Juan Quilligan (1945) – Defense Attorney
 So Goes My Love (1946) – Mr. Josephus Ford
 The Bride Wore Boots (1946) – Jeff's Attorney (uncredited)
 Do You Love Me (1946) – Ralph Wainwright
 White Tie and Tails (1946) – Archer
 Nobody Lives Forever (1946) – Charles Manning
 Humoresque (1946) – Bauer
 Brute Force (1947) – McCallum
 The Hucksters (1947) – Cooke
 Unconquered (1947) – Col. George Washington
 Ride the Pink Horse (1947) – Jonathan
 The Invisible Wall (1947) – Richard Elsworth
 Cass Timberlane (1947) – Dennis Thane
 Dangerous Years (1947) – Edgar Burns
 That Wonderful Urge (1948) – Whitson – Farley's Executive
 Every Girl Should Be Married (1948) – Sam McNutt
 The Lucky Stiff (1949) – Dist. Atty. John Logan
 Strange Bargain (1949) – Malcolm Jarvis
 A Kiss for Corliss (1949) – Taylor
 Key to the City (1950) – Speaker on TV Broadcast (uncredited)
 Ace in the Hole (1951) – Nagel
 Flight to Mars (1951) – Prof. Jackson
 Cavalcade of America (1952–1954, TV Series) – George Washington / Dr. Hayes
 Marry Me Again (1953) – Dr. Pepperdine
 Drum Beat (1954) – Dr. Thomas
 Love Me or Leave Me (1955) – Paul Hunter
 The Petrified Forest (1955, live televised version)
 Trial (1955) – Dr. Johannes Albert Schacter
 Ransom! (1956) – Langly
 Francis in the Haunted House (1956) – D.A. Reynolds
 5 Steps to Danger (1957) – Dean Brant
 Jeanne Eagels (1957) – Judge (uncredited)
 Perry Mason (1958–1961, TV Series) – Judge / Judge Carwell / Judge Treadwell
 The Big Fisherman (1959) – Minor Role (uncredited)
 The Donna Reed Show (1959, TV Series) – Dr. Elias Spaulding
 Alfred Hitchcock Presents (1960–1962, TV Series) – M. J. Harrison / James Barrett (final appearance)
 The Great Impostor (1961) – Chairman (uncredited)
 The Outsider (1961) – Chairman (uncredited)

References

External links 
 

1904 births
1975 deaths
20th-century American male actors
American male film actors
American male television actors